Pilangorg (also Romanized as Pīlān Gorg; also known as najafiyeh ) is a village in Hayaquq-e Nabi Rural District, in the Central District of Tuyserkan County, Hamadan Province, Iran. At the 2016 census, its population was 190, in 84 families.

References 

Populated places in Tuyserkan County